Disco Step-by-Step was a local television show in Buffalo, New York which featured disco music, dance instruction, and hustle dancing. The show was created, written, produced and first hosted by Marty Angelo.

Taped during 1975 and 1976, the show was seen on local Public-access television cable TV channels in Buffalo and western New York State from January 1, 1977 to June 30, 1977; the program was shot in black and white.

On September 23, 1977, the show moved to WBEN-TV (channel 4, now WIVB), where the show saw various technical improvements, including color. The show's host changed with the move, with the duties now passed to Kevin O'Connell, who at the time was also WBEN-TV's weatherman. The program ran in the form of first-run and repeat telecasts on WBEN-TV until January 15, 1980.

Various video clips of the show were featured in 2005 in the Experience Music Project's travelling , a VH1 television disco special, and a DVD disco documentary.

References

Dance television shows
Disco
1970s American television series
1980s American television series
1977 American television series debuts
1980 American television series endings
American public access television shows